The Encyclopedia of Appalachia is the first encyclopedia dedicated to the region, people, culture, history, and geography of Appalachia. The Region, as defined by the Appalachian Regional Commission, is a 205,000-square-mile area that follows the spine of the Appalachian Mountains from southern New York to northern Mississippi. It includes all of West Virginia and parts of 12 other states: Alabama, Georgia, Kentucky, Maryland, Mississippi, New York, North Carolina, Ohio, Pennsylvania, South Carolina, Tennessee, and Virginia. Forty-two percent of this Region's population is rural, compared with 20 percent of the national population, but the region also includes urban areas, such as Pittsburgh and Chattanooga. The encyclopedia is 1,832 pages long and contains over 2,000 entries.  Produced by the Center of Excellence for Appalachian Studies and Services at East Tennessee State University (ETSU), Rudy Abramson and Dr. Jean Haskell, are the two main editors of the encyclopedia. Jill Oxendine served as managing editor. The volume was published in March 2006 by the University of Tennessee Press. It includes a foreword by William Ferris, former chair of the National Endowment for the Humanities, who called the encyclopedia "truly a feast of information about its region . . . a remarkably detailed portrait of a landscape that runs from New York to Mississippi.” The volume also includes an appreciation by Henry Louis Gates, Jr., Alphonse Fletcher University Professor and Director of the Hutchins Center for African and African American Research at Harvard University, who is a native of West Virginia. Gates wrote that the encyclopedia "lays out for everyone else what we who grew up there have always known. Appalachia is a rich and beautiful land steeped in tradition and open to change. It is home to countless storytellers and stories without end. Both its lushness and its rockiness teach us to make our way in the world, but Appalachia never leaves us."

The volume is still in print from University of Tennessee Press. An online edition was initiated in 2011, which included only the Music section, but was discontinued. The ETSU Center of Excellence for Appalachian Studies and Services, now directed by Dr. Ron Roach, has begun a project to produce an updated, digital version of the entire encyclopedia, which will be available online for free.

Organization
The print version of the encyclopedia has 1832 pages. It is organized into the following five main sections with respective subsections:

The Landscape
Geology
Ecology
Environment

The People
Family and Community
Images and Icons
Race, Ethnicity, and Identity
Settlement and Migration
Urban Appalachian Experience

Work and the Economy
Agriculture
Business, Industry, and Technology
Labor
Tourism
Transportation

Cultural Traditions
Architecture
Crafts
Folklore and Folklife
Food and Cooking
Humor
Language
Literature
Music
Performing Arts
Religion
Sports and Recreation
Visual Arts

Institutions
Cultural Institutions
Education
Government
Health
Media

Notes

External links
University of Tennessee Press website for the Encyclopedia of Appalachia

Appalachia
Books about Appalachia
East Tennessee State University
Appalachian studies
American online encyclopedias
Area studies encyclopedias